Lev Sergeyevich Kornilov (born 26 January 1984) is a Russian former professional footballer.

Club career
He played 6 seasons in the Russian Football National League for 7 different teams.

External links
 
 

1984 births
People from Nakhodka
Living people
Russian footballers
Association football midfielders
FC Okean Nakhodka players
FC Dynamo Barnaul players
FC Ural Yekaterinburg players
FC Luch Vladivostok players
FC Tyumen players
FC SKA-Khabarovsk players
FC Torpedo Moscow players
FC Saturn Ramenskoye players
Russian people of Abkhazian descent
FC Neftekhimik Nizhnekamsk players
FC Dynamo Bryansk players
FC Nosta Novotroitsk players
Sportspeople from Primorsky Krai